HX 79 was an Allied North Atlantic convoy of the HX series which ran during the Battle of the Atlantic in World War II.

It suffered major losses from a U-boat attack, and, with the attack on convoy SC 7 the previous day, represents the worst two days shipping losses in the entire Atlantic campaign.

Prelude

HX 79 was an east-bound convoy of 50 ships which sailed from Halifax on 8 October 1940 making for Liverpool.
On 19 October, 4 days from landfall, HX 79 was entering the Western Approaches, and had caught up with the position of SC 7, which was under attack.

At this point HX 79 was unescorted; Prien sent a sighting report and set to shadowing the convoy, while Konteradmiral Karl Dönitz ordered the pack to assemble. Those U-boats which had attacked SC 7 and were still able to fight (three had departed to re-arm having expended all their torpedoes) were directed to the scene.

However the Admiralty, concerned by the fate of SC 7 and anticipating an attack sent escorts to the convoy; throughout the day they arrived piecemeal eventually totaling 11 warships.

Action

The pack attacked as night fell; using the darkness to cover an approach on the surface, Prien penetrated the escort screen from the south to attack from within the convoy, while Endrass (who had previously served with Prien as his deputy), did the same from the north.

Over the next six hours, 13 ships were torpedoed; 6 by U-47 alone (4 of which were sunk, a fifth was finished by U-48). 10 ships  were sunk from the convoy, and 2 stragglers were lost later in the day. These were Shirak, which had been torpedoed in the night, and Loch Lomond, sailing with the convoy as a rescue ship. Another, Athelmonarch, was damaged but was able to make port.

None of the attacking U-boats were damaged.

Ships in the convoy

Allied merchant ships
A total of 50 merchant vessels joined the convoy, either in Halifax or later in the voyage.  The SS Erna III returned to Halifax before the convoy was attacked by the assembled German wolfpack.

Convoy escorts
A series of armed military ships escorted the convoy at various times during its journey.

Conclusion

Despite the number of escorts, they had been ineffective; the ships were uncoordinated, being unused to working together, and having no common battle plan or tactics. The escorts had arrived singly, being dispatched as and when available, this being the common practice at the time. Command of the escort force fell to the senior officer present, and could change as each new ship arrived. Any tactical arrangements had to be made on the spot, and communicated by signal lamp to each ship in turn.

The failure of the escort led to a number of changes in escort policy. The first to take effect was the formation of permanent escort groups, which would operate together under defined leadership. This led to the development of consistent tactics, and teamwork, with an increasing effectiveness.

References

Bibliography
 
 Arnold Hague : The Allied Convoy System 1939–1945 (2000). ISBN (Canada) 1 55125 033 0 . ISBN (UK) 1 86176 147 3
 
 
 Stephen Roskill : The War at Sea 1939–1945  Vol I (1954).   ISBN (none)

External links
 HX 79 at convoyweb

HX079
Naval battles of World War II involving Canada
C